Jorge Torales (born 1 June 1984) is a Paraguayan football striker.

External links

1984 births
Living people
Paraguayan footballers
Paraguayan expatriate footballers
Association football forwards
Chacarita Juniors footballers
Olimpo footballers
C.S. Emelec footballers
Defensor Sporting players
Sportivo Trinidense footballers
Everton de Viña del Mar footballers
C.S.D. Independiente del Valle footballers
Club Nacional footballers
Club Atlético 3 de Febrero players
Estudiantes de Río Cuarto footballers
Paraguayan Primera División players
Argentine Primera División players
Ecuadorian Serie A players
Chilean Primera División players
Expatriate footballers in Argentina
Expatriate footballers in Ecuador
Expatriate footballers in Uruguay
Expatriate footballers in Chile